George Henry Stanton (3 September 18354 December 1905) was an Anglican bishop in the second half of the 19th century and the early part of the 20th.

Stanton was born in Stratford, Essex, England and educated at Hertford College, Oxford graduating B.A. in 1858 and M.A. in 1862, receiving the honorary degree of Doctor of Divinity in 1878. He was ordained deacon in 1858 by Charles Sumner, Bishop of Winchester, and priest in 1859, and was Curate of Christ Church, Rotherhithe, from 1858 to 1862; of All Saints Church, Maidstone, from 1862 to 1864, of St. Saviour's, Fitzroy Square, London, from 1864 to 1867; and vicar of Holy Trinity, St. Giles-in-the-Fields, London, from 1867 to 1878.
 
Stanton was Vicar of Holy Trinity, Lincoln's Inn Fields He was consecrated a bishop by Archibald Campbell Tait, Archbishop of Canterbury, on the Feast of the Nativity of Saint John the Baptist 1878 (24 June) at St Paul's Cathedral. Appointed the inaugural Bishop of North Queensland in 1878, he was translated to Newcastle, NSW in 1890 and  died in post on 5 December 1905.

References 

1835 births
People from Stratford, London
Alumni of Hertford College, Oxford
Anglican bishops of North Queensland
Anglican bishops of Newcastle (Australia)
1905 deaths